Triglochin maritima is a species of flowering plant in the arrowgrass family Juncaginaceae. It is found in brackish marshes, freshwater marshes, wet sandy beaches, fens, damp grassland and bogs. It has a circumboreal distribution, occurring throughout the northern Northern Hemisphere. In the British Isles it is common on the coast, but very rare inland.

Description
It is similar to marsh arrowgrass (Triglochin palustris) but has the following differences: it has stolons, is stouter. The leaves are fleshy and not furrowed above. It is not very aromatic. The raceme are more dense and like sea plantain. The flowers are fleshier. The fruits are oval, 4 mm long, 2 mm wide.

Common names include seaside arrowgrass, common arrowgrass, sea arrowgrass and shore arrowgrass.

It can be an annual or perennial.

Triglochin concinna is a synonym of this species.

This plant is toxic, as it can produce cyanide. This species has been known to cause losses in cattle, with green leaves being more toxic than dried material.

References

Juncaginaceae
Plants described in 1753
Taxa named by Carl Linnaeus
Brackish water plants
Freshwater plants